Jens Dowe (born 1 June 1968) is a German former professional footballer who played as an attacking midfielder He later worked as a manager and as a sports director.

Career
Born in Rostock, Dowe had three different spells as a player with his hometown club Hansa Rostock, with whom he won the final staging of the DDR-Oberliga (East German Premier League) in 1991.

He also played in the Bundesliga for TSV 1860 Munich and Hamburg. Dowe spent spells abroad in the English First Division with Wolverhampton Wanderers, and in Austria, with Sturm Graz.

He moved into coaching after retiring from playing in 2005.

Honours
Hansa Rostock
 DDR-Oberliga: 1990–91
 FDGB-Pokal: 1990–91

Sturm Graz
 Austrian Cup: 1996–97

References

External links
 

1968 births
Living people
Sportspeople from Rostock
Association football midfielders
German footballers
East German footballers
Footballers from Mecklenburg-Western Pomerania
FC Hansa Rostock players
TSV 1860 Munich players
Hamburger SV players
Wolverhampton Wanderers F.C. players
SK Sturm Graz players
SK Rapid Wien players
SV Babelsberg 03 players
Holstein Kiel players
SV Wilhelmshaven players
TSG Neustrelitz players
DDR-Oberliga players
Bundesliga players
2. Bundesliga players
English Football League players
Austrian Football Bundesliga players
German football managers
Greifswalder SV 04 managers
German expatriate footballers
German expatriate sportspeople in England
German expatriate sportspeople in Austria